Saedinenie (until 1934 Golyamo Konare ) is a town in the Plovdiv Province, central Bulgaria. As of 2006 it has 6 302 inhabitants. There is a new electronics plant there with 540 employees.

Honour
Saedinenie Snowfield on Livingston Island in the South Shetland Islands, Antarctica is named the town of Saedinenie in association with the 120th anniversary of the Reunification of the Principality of Bulgaria and the province of Eastern Rumelia in 1885.

Populated places in Plovdiv Province
Towns in Bulgaria